Werlte is a town in the Emsland district, in Lower Saxony, Germany.

History
Werlte was a host city of the 2008 Team Long Track World Championship; the championship was won by Germany.

Economy
Werlte is home to a factory of the Krone company.

Twin towns – sister cities
Werlte is twinned with:

  Lidzbark Warmiński, Poland (2005)

Sons and daughters 
 Ingrid Matthäus-Maier (born 1945), German politician (SPD)

References

Emsland